"What's Up Doc? (Can We Rock)" is the lead single from Fu-Schnickens' second studio album, Nervous Breakdown. The song featured NBA star Shaquille O'Neal and was produced by Main Source member K-Cut. The song was a top-40 hit in 1993 and was certified gold by the RIAA for sales of 500,000 copies.

Background
Released in the summer of 1993, "What's Up Doc? (Can We Rock)" became a top 40 hit, peaking at No. 39 on the Billboard Hot 100. The song had previously been simply titled "What's Up Doc?" and featured a sample of Bugs Bunny saying the title, but because the group could not get sample clearance from Warner Bros., this version was not released. Meanwhile, NBA player Shaquille O'Neal had become a media sensation in his first season. In many interviews, he talked about his love of hip hop music and stated that Fu-Schnickens were his favorite group. This prompted the group to contact O'Neal for a collaboration. O'Neal recorded a verse that was added to the song, along with the spoken line "What's up, doc?" to replace the Bugs Bunny sample. Although the group had not yet completed recording their album Nervous Breakdown, the song was quickly released as a single to capitalize on O'Neal's popularity. The single was a Top 40 hit in the summer of 1993, briefly propelling the group into the mainstream. The song first appeared on an album recorded by O'Neal, Shaq Diesel. Nervous Breakdown was finally released in October 1994, over a year after the single's release.  The music video was filmed underneath the Manhattan Bridge, on the Manhattan side.

Track listing
"What's up Doc? (Can We Rock)" (LP Version)- 3:57
"What's up Doc? (Can We Rock)" (K-Cut's Mad Master Remix)- 4:04
"What's up Doc? (Can We Rock)" (K-Cut's Fat Trac Remix)- 3:59
"True Fuschnick" (Phase 5 Euro-Dub Remix)- 4:19
"Heavenly Father" (Tempted 2 Touch Murder Mix)- 5:10
"What's Up Doc? (Can We Rock)"- 3:56

Charts

Certifications

References

1993 songs
1993 singles
Fu-Schnickens songs
Shaquille O'Neal songs
Songs written by Shaquille O'Neal
Jive Records singles